Arctostaphylos tomentosa is a species of manzanita known by the common name woollyleaf manzanita or woolley  manzanita. This shrub is endemic to California.

It is a resident of chaparral canyons, foothills, and lower-elevation mountains. One specialized habitat in which A. tomentosa is found is the Monterey Cypress forests at Point Lobos and Del Monte Forest in Monterey County, California.

Description
This is a low-lying, spreading manzanita, generally quite a bit wider than it is tall. It is a variable species and even some of the subspecies can vary in appearance across individuals. The stems may be red or gray or both, with smooth, rough, or shreddy bark, hairless to quite bristly. The leaves may be oval to lance-shaped and sometimes toothed, but the upper surface is generally darker and shinier than the lower.

The flowers are white to pink and may be hairy or hairless inside. The fruits are fuzzy reddish drupes under a centimeter in diameter.

Subspecies
There are many subspecies:
A. tomentosa subsp. bracteosa — uncommon subspecies from the vicinity of Monterey
A. tomentosa subsp. crinita — from the southern San Francisco Bay Area
A. tomentosa subsp. crustacea — (brittleleaf manzanita), widespread
A. tomentosa subsp. daciticola — (dacite manzanita), from San Luis Obispo County.
A. tomentosa subsp. eastwoodiana — from Santa Barbara County
A. tomentosa ssp. hebeclada — from southwestern Santa Cruz Mountains.
A. tomentosa subsp. insulicola — (island-loving manzanita), scattered in the Channel Islands
A. tomentosa subsp. rosei — (rosy manzanita), from the central and northern coasts
A. tomentosa subsp. subcordata — (Santa Cruz Island manzanita), restricted to the Channel Islands
A. tomentosa subsp. tomentosa — found along the Central Coast.

See also
California chaparral and woodlands — ecoregion.
California coastal sage and chaparral — subregion.
California montane chaparral and woodlands — subregion.

References

External links

Jepson Manual Treatment: Arctostaphylos tomentosa
USDA Plants Profile for Arctostaphylos tomentosa (woolly leaf manzanita)
Arctostaphylos tomentosa — Photo gallery

tomentosa
Endemic flora of California
Natural history of the California chaparral and woodlands
Natural history of the California Coast Ranges
Plants described in 1813
Natural history of Monterey County, California
Natural history of San Luis Obispo County, California
Natural history of Santa Barbara County, California
Natural history of Santa Cruz County, California
~
~
Flora without expected TNC conservation status